The United States Court for Berlin was a United States Article II court that had extraterritorial jurisdiction over American-occupied Berlin. It was in existence from 1955 until the Two plus Four Treaty in 1990.

The United States High Commissioner for Germany functioned until the abolition of the Allied High Commission on 5 May 1955 pursuant to the Bonn–Paris conventions. On 28 April 1955, only a few days before the occupation regime terminated in the rest of Germany, the High Commissioner promulgated Law No. 46 establishing the United States Court for Berlin.

The Court was only convened once, in 1979, to hear the jury trial of the LOT Flight 165 hijacking defendants. The case (U.S. v. Tiede) was notable in holding that the reach of the United States Constitution was a legal rather than a political question, citing jurisprudence dating back to Ex parte Milligan, where the United States Supreme Court had declared, "The Constitution of the United States is a law for rulers and people, equally in war and in peace, and covers with the shield of its protection all classes of men, at all times, and under all circumstances."

During his appointment, Judge Herbert Jay Stern was subjected to intense diplomatic pressure, which he alluded to when he sentenced Tiede to time served, and noted that there was "probably not a great future" for the Court. This was confirmed at the end of the criminal trial, when a group of West Germans filed a civil suit with it alleging that a US military housing development violated a German zoning law. Walter J. Stoessel Jr. (at that time the United States Ambassador to West Germany) advised Stern that his appointment was only for the criminal case that had been heard, and it was accordingly terminated. The claimants later attempted to bring its suit in the United States District Court for the District of Columbia, where it was dismissed.

Notes

References

Bibliography
 
 

1955 establishments in the United States
1990 disestablishments in the United States
Berlin
Legal history of Germany
Cold War
West Berlin
Courts and tribunals established in 1955
Courts and tribunals disestablished in 1990